Guillermo Manuel Ruggeri Gutila (born 26 March 1992 in Maipú) is an Argentine athlete specialising in the 400 metres hurdles. He represented his country at the 2017 World Championships, reaching the semifinals.

His personal best in the event is 49.28 seconds set in Cochabamba in 2018 which is the current national record. Earlier in his career he competed in the decathlon.

International competitions

1Disqualified in the semifinals

References

1992 births
Living people
Argentine male hurdlers
Argentine decathletes
World Athletics Championships athletes for Argentina
People from Maipú, Argentina
Athletes (track and field) at the 2018 South American Games
South American Games gold medalists for Argentina
South American Games bronze medalists for Argentina
South American Games medalists in athletics
Athletes (track and field) at the 2019 Pan American Games
Pan American Games competitors for Argentina
South American Games gold medalists in athletics
Sportspeople from Mendoza Province
21st-century Argentine people